Corydoras parallelus is a tropical freshwater fish belonging to the Corydoradinae sub-family of the family Callichthyidae. It originates in inland waters in South America. Corydoras parallelus is restricted to the Upper Negro River basin.

References

Reis, R.E., 2003. Callichthyidae (Armored catfishes). p. 291-309. In R.E. Reis, S.O. Kullander and C.J. Ferraris, Jr. (eds.) Checklist of the Freshwater Fishes of South and Central America. Porto Alegre: EDIPUCRS, Brasil.  

Corydoras
Catfish of South America
Taxa named by Warren E. Burgess
Fish described in 1993